B. S. Narayana is an Indian film, director known for his works predominantly in Telugu cinema. He has garnered two National Film Awards & two Nandi Awards. He was a member of the Indian delegation to the Tashkent Film Festival in 1974, and the Moscow International Film Festival in 1975.

Awards
National Film Awards for Best Feature Film in Telugu
Oorummadi Brathukulu (1976)
Nimajjanam (1979)

Nandi Awards
Best Feature Film - Gold - Oorummadi Brathukulu (1976)
Best Film on National Integration - Margadarsi (1993)

Filmography
As director
Edureetha (1963)
Thirupathamma Katha (1963)
Visala Hrudayalu (1965)
Aame Evaru? (1966)
 Ananda Nilayam (1971)
Sreevaru Maavaru (1973)
Aadavallu-Apanindalu (1976)
Oorummadi Brathukulu (1976)  Best Film Nandi Award (Bronze category) 
Nimajjanam (1979) Urvasi Award to Sharada
Aadadi Gadapadatithe (1980)
Maargadarsi (1993) Directed under complete Blindness (Limca Book of Records: First Blind Film Director)

References

Telugu film directors
Living people
Telugu film producers
Nandi Award winners
Year of birth missing (living people)